Riverside High School is the largest high school in Kanawha County, and is located in Belle, West Virginia, United States.

History
The school opened in 1999 as a result of the consolidation of DuPont High School (AAA) in Dupont City and East Bank High School (AA) in East Bank. Students from both of those former high schools, and from the Cedar Grove and Montgomery areas, attend the school. The school's attendance district runs from the Kanawha-Fayette county line to the Charleston city limits.

Academics
Riverside High offers a wide variety of courses and electives for grades 9–12. Required classes include Science 9 & 10, English 12 and Civics. Electives include AP Calculus, Forensic Science and Community Service.

Athletics 
Riverside High is a West Virginia AAA school. The school has had several successful sports teams in the 10+ years it has been in operation. They are wrestling, volleyball, track & field, softball, baseball, soccer, basketball, tennis, cross country, cheerleading, golf, and football.

Marching Warriors 
The school has had two baton twirlers named Miss Kanawha Majorette at the Gazette-Mail Kanawha County Majorette and Band Festival. In 2016 the Warrior Band received a 1 at ratings. This is the highest score.

Facilities
The school premises have a full-service branch of the Kanawha County Public Library, a Pioneer Federal credit union, and facilities operated by Cabin Creek Health Center.

2019 expansion
On September 6, 2016, a special state committee voted to close Valley High School in nearby Fayette County and send some of its students to Riverside, which made Riverside a multi-county high school.  Starting in August 2019, 135 Fayette County students choose to attend Riverside.

Alumni

Dupont
Randy Moss, sports analyst and former American football player
Jason Williams, basketball player

East Bank
 Jerry West, basketball executive and former player

References 

Public high schools in West Virginia
Schools in Kanawha County, West Virginia
Educational institutions established in 1999
1999 establishments in West Virginia